was a Japanese domain of the Edo period, located in Shimōsa Province (modern-day Chiba Prefecture), Japan. The site of the Oyumi jin'ya is now under a residential area of the city of Chiba. The domain was ruled through its entire history by the Morikawa clan.

History
Oyumi Domain was created in February 1627, when Morikawa Shigetoshi, a hatamoto in the service of Shōgun Tokugawa Hidetada acquired holdings in Sagami, Kazusa and Shimōsa Provinces with revenues  exceeding the 10,000  koku  necessary to qualify as a daimyō. He was allowed to build a jin'ya on the site of the Sengoku period Oyumi Castle. He later rose to the post of rōjū, and committed junshi on the death of Tokugawa Hidetada. His successors continued to rule Oyumi Domain until the Meiji Restoration.

Holdings at the end of the Edo period
As with most domains in the han system, Oyumi Domain consisted of several discontinuous territories calculated to provide the assigned kokudaka, based on periodic cadastral surveys and projected agricultural yields. 
The domain was centered on what is now Chuo Ward and Midori Ward of the  city of Chiba. 
Shimōsa Province
19 villages in Chiba District
3 villages in Sōsa District
1 village in Kaijō District
Kazusa Province
1 village in Nagara District
1 village in Musha District
Sagami Province
1 village in Kamakura District
3 villages in Osumi District

List of daimyō
  Morikawa clan (fudai) 1627-1871

References
Bolitho, Harold (1974). Treasures among men; the fudai daimyo in Tokugawa Japan. New Haven: Yale University Press.
Kodama Kōta 児玉幸多, Kitajima Masamoto 北島正元 (1966). Kantō no shohan 関東の諸藩. Tokyo: Shin Jinbutsu Ōraisha.

External links
 Genealogy of the lords of Oyumi

Notes

Domains of Japan
1627 establishments in Japan
States and territories established in 1627
1871 disestablishments in Japan
States and territories disestablished in 1871
Shimōsa Province
History of Chiba Prefecture